Reeve Township is one of ten townships in Daviess County, Indiana. As of the 2010 census, its population was 631 and it contained 257 housing units.

History
Reeve Township was organized on May 12, 1817, at the first meeting of the Daviess County Commissioners.  It was named for its earliest resident, South Carolina native Joshua Reeve, who had settled in the township in 1808.  As the first settler in the area, Reeve lived in an isolated cabin in the forest; in order to obtain needed supplies, he was forced to travel to Vincennes.  Desiring to simplify his travels, Reeve blazed a trail through the woods from his home to Vincennes; in later years, the route became a road, and by the early twentieth century it had become one of the county's leading highways.

Geography
Big Piney Pond and Little Piney Pond are in this township.

Cities and towns
 Alfordsville

Unincorporated towns
 Corning
 Pennyville

Adjacent townships
 Barr Township (north)
 Perry Township, Martin County (northeast)
 Rutherford Township, Martin County (east)
 Harbison Township, Dubois County (southeast)
 Boone Township, Dubois County (south)
 Harrison Township (west)

Cemeteries
The township contains three cemeteries: the Alfordsville Christian Cemetery just north of town, Old Union Cemetery on the land originally owned by James Allen and his wife, Mary Hizer Allen, southwest of town, and the Helpenstine Cemetery (also known as the McCord Cemetery) east of town on the County Line Road.

References
 United States Census Bureau cartographic boundary files
 U.S. Board on Geographic Names

External links

 Indiana Township Association
 United Township Association of Indiana

Townships in Daviess County, Indiana
Townships in Indiana